Poornima Arvind Pakvasa (5 October 1913 – 25 April 2016), known as the Didi of Dangs, was an Indian independence activist and social worker from Gujarat.

Early life

Pakvasa was born in Ranpur near Limbdi State, Saurashtra (now in Gujarat). She was also Manipuri dancer and classical vocal singer.

Political and social activism
Pakvasa first met Mahatma Gandhi at Ranpur when she was eight. She participated in the independence movement in Limbdi. At the age of 18, she participated in the Dandi March during which she was arrested. Her inmate in jail was Kasturba Gandhi. Pakvasa taught her how to read and write English. Mahatma Gandhi was appreciative of this act and gave her his blessings to continue on the path of education.

She participated in the 51st session of the Indian National Congress at Haripura in 1938.

In 1954, she started Shaktidal, an institution for the cultural, physical and spiritual education of women in Bombay (now Mumbai). She headed the Bhosla Military School, Nashik for 25 years. Later in 1974, she established Ritambhara Vishwa Vidyapeeth and extended its activities to become a residential school and college at Saputara. The school chiefly served tribal girls of Dang. She turned 100 in October 2013 and died on 25 April 2016 at the age of 102 in Surat. Her last rites were performed in Saputara by her children.

Awards 
In 2004 she was awarded the Padma Bhushan award for her services to society. She was awarded Santokbaa Award in 2013.

Personal life 
She married Arvind Pakvasa and was a daughter-in-law of Mangaldas Pakvasa. She had two daughters - Aarti and Sonal Mansingh - and a son Anuj. Sonal Mansingh is an Indian classical dancer.

References

External links
Profile of Poornima Arvind Pakvasa

1913 births
2016 deaths
Indian centenarians
Social workers from Gujarat
Recipients of the Padma Bhushan in social work
Social workers
Women educators from Gujarat
Educators from Gujarat
20th-century Indian educators
20th-century Indian women
People from Botad district
Gandhians
Indian independence activists from Gujarat
Women centenarians
20th-century women educators